"Epiphanias" (German title: "Epiphaniasfest") is a Christmas-themed poem by Johann Wolfgang von Goethe (1749–1832). The title is the German word for the Christian feast of Epiphany.

"Epiphanias" may also refer to various pieces of music to which the poem is set, including by Hugo Wolf.

References

External links
 (in English), from The Works of J. W. von Goethe, vol. 9. pp. 111–112, F. A. Nicolls (London, Boston, 1900)
Goethe's Werke. Vollständige Ausgabe letzter Hand, Volume 1, p. 151 (in German), J. G. Cotta'sche Buchhandlung, 1827

Poetry by Johann Wolfgang von Goethe
Christmas poems